Kranichsteiner Literaturpreis is a literary prize of Germany. The Deutsche Literaturfonds (German Literature Fund) based in Darmstadt has been awarding the prize since 1983. The prize money was raised in 2019 from €20,000 to €30,000. In addition to the main prize, the Kranichsteiner Literaturförderpreis is also awarded. In 2020 the Deutsche Literaturfonds renamed the prize to Großer Preis des Deutschen Literaturfonds (Grand Prize of the German Literature Fund) and the prize money has been raised to €50,000. It is awarded for an outstanding literary work, taking into account the current book.

Recipients

Kranichsteiner Literaturpreis

 1983: Rainald Goetz
 1984: Adelheid Duvanel
 1985: Helga M. Novak
 1986: Anne Duden
 1987: Wolfgang Hilbig
 1988: Klaus Hensel
 1989: Thomas Strittmatter
 1990: Josef Winkler
 1991: Herta Müller
 1992: Ludwig Fels
 1993: Jan Faktor
 1995: Hansjörg Schertenleib
 1996: Burkhard Spinnen
 1997: Birgit Vanderbeke
 1998: Thomas Meinecke
 1999: Lutz Seiler
 2001: Wilhelm Genazino
 2002: Ralf Rothmann
 2003: Reinhard Jirgl
 2004: Peter Kurzeck
 2005: Martin Mosebach
 2006: Sibylle Lewitscharoff
 2007: Paul Nizon
 2008: Gerhard Falkner
 2009: Gerd-Peter Eigner
 2010: Anne Weber
 2011: Jan Wagner
 2012: Frank Schulz
 2013: Marica Bodrožić
 2014: David Wagner
 2015: Esther Kinsky
 2016: Ulrich Peltzer
 2017: Nico Bleutge
 2018: Thomas Lehr
 2019: Nora Bossong

Großer Preis des Deutschen Literaturfonds
 2020: Felicitas Hoppe
 2021: Ulrike Draesner
 2022: Georg Klein

References

External links
 

German literary awards